The 1886 South Australian Football Association season was the 10th season of the top-level Australian rules football competition in South Australia.

This was the first season in South Australia that quarters were played, allowing ends to be changed four times per match.

The thirty games played had crowd figures quoted for an approximate average of 2,055 spectators per game.

Premiership season

Round 1

Round 2

Round 3

Round 4

Round 5

Round 6

Round 7

Round 8

Round 9

Round 10

Round 11

Round 12

Round 13

Round 14

Round 15

Round 16

Round 17

Round 18

Round 19

Round 20

Round 21

Ladder

Attendances 
The figures for club and ground attendances are only based on those given above.

By Club

By ground

References 

SANFL
South Australian National Football League seasons